Defensor ANDA is a Peruvian football club, playing in the city of Huánuco, Peru.

The club is the biggest of Aucayacu city, and one of the biggest in Leoncio Prado Province.

The club were founded 24 June 1977 and play in the Copa Perú which is the third division of the Peruvian league.

History
El Club Defensor A.N.D.A. (Asociación Nacional De Agricultores) is a football club of the city of Aucayacu, in the Leoncio Prado Province, in Huánuco, Peru.

The club have played at the highest level of Peruvian football on seven occasions, from 1984 Torneo Descentralizado until 1990 Torneo Descentralizado when was relegated to the Copa Perú.

See also
List of football clubs in Peru
Peruvian football league system

Football clubs in Peru